Polygraph.info is a fact-checking website produced by Voice of America (VoA). Among many subjects, the website documents Russian disinformation and state-backed propaganda by the Chinese government. 

Radio Free Europe funded a three person team at Polygraph.info until February 2017. The team was led by Daily Beast senior editor Michael Weiss.

As of April 8, 2020, the project employed five people. VoA journalist Jim Fry was its managing editor from November 2017 to November 2019. Investigative journalist, researcher and Russian expert Fatima Tlisova also works at Polygraph.info.

A partner website in the Russian language is factograph.info, a joint project of RFE/RL and VoA.

References

External links 
 

Voice of America
Fact-checking websites
Radio Free Europe/Radio Liberty